Long Eaton railway station serves the town of Long Eaton in Derbyshire, England. The station is managed by East Midlands Railway, but CrossCountry operates some services.

History
The line was opened by the Midland Counties Railway in 1839, which shortly joined the North Midland Railway and the Birmingham and Derby Junction Railway to form the Midland Railway. The first Sawley station was a mile out of the village on Sawley Lane, Breaston. First used in 1839, when the line opened, it was the third station from Nottingham. It was originally called Breaston, but the name was changed to avoid confusion with Beeston.

This station was designed by A. A. Langley, engineer to the Midland Railway, and opened as Sawley Junction on 10 December 1888 on Tamworth Road. Since another station had been opened not far away at Draycott in 1852, the original Sawley closed in 1930.

On 9 October 1869 a Midland Railway passenger train was involved in a rear-end collision with another train at Long Eaton Junction resulting in seven deaths and another twelve injured. The investigation blamed fog, inadequate braking power, excessive speed and fog-man error for the collision.

In 1932, the LMS announced that Sawley Junction would be known as Sawley Junction for Long Eaton.

In 1967 the station became known as Long Eaton.

Since late 2009, Long Eaton has become a penalty fare station. Tickets must be purchased from the ticket office or self-service machine before boarding a train.

Stationmasters

A. Burchell 1888 - 1891 
G. Gardner 1891 - 1894 (discharged)
Thomas Smith  1895 - 1904  (afterwards station master at Saltley)
A. Wyer 1904 - 1920 (afterwards station master at Doe Hill)
F. Parr 1920 - 1924
J. Ecclestone from 1924 (formerly station master at Ditchford)
Rupert D. Hitchens 1937 - 1941 (afterwards station master at Albion)
John H. Farmer from 1941 
George Manning ca. 1947 - ca. 1965

For some years from the 1920s until 1937, the station was managed by the station master at Trent Junction.

Services

Rail routes run north–south through Long Eaton along the route known as the Midland Main Line, going south to Loughborough, Leicester, Luton and London; and north to Derby, Chesterfield and Sheffield.

A major junction south of the station at Trent links with the cross-country route to Nottingham. West bound services to Birmingham travel via Derby and the Cross Country Route.

Train operators using the station include CrossCountry and East Midlands Railway.

The usual Monday–Saturday service pattern is as follows:

Cross-country
One train per hour (tph) to Nottingham (platform 1)
1 tph to Cardiff Central (platform 2)
East Midlands Railway
1 tph to London St Pancras (platform 1)
1 tph to Sheffield (platform 2)
1 tph to Matlock (platform 2)
1 tph to Crewe (platform 2)
On Sundays, the London to Sheffield trains call hourly each way and the Matlock trains every two hours. There is an hourly Derby to Nottingham stopping service in each direction, but no direct service to Birmingham.

Current station
The usable length of the station platforms is shorter than the Intercity trains which stop here. Passengers arriving from London, Derby or Sheffield usually have to get off from the front four carriages. Cycles are sometimes stored in vestibules away from the cycle lockers, depending on the orientation of the train.

The station is staffed between 06:00 and 17:30 during the day and has three automatic ticket machines installed externally, which can be used day and night: at the station front and on platform 1 and 2 inside the platform shelter.

It was planned that both platforms would be extended by up to 10 metres by no later than 2012. This was not completed and the platform has not been extended.

Developments along the Erewash line are expected to bring changes to Long Eaton station. A plan drawn up in 2011 recommended a new Derby to Mansfield service via new stations at Breaston & Draycott, Long Eaton West (renamed from Long Eaton), Long Eaton Central, Stapleford & Sandiacre, Ilkeston, Eastwood & Langley Mill (renamed from Langley Mill), Selston & Somercotes and then to Pinxton via new trackbed connecting with the Mansfield line from Nottingham at Kirkby in Ashfield.

References

The Nottingham and Derby Railway Companion, 1839, republished 1979 with a foreword by J. B. Radford, Derbyshire Record Society
C. Banks, 1996. British Railways Past and Present: Nottinghamshire and Derbyshire, Past and Present Publishing Ltd
M. Higginson, 1989. The Midland Counties Railway: A Pictorial Survey, Derby: Midland Railway Trust

External links

Railway stations in Derbyshire
DfT Category D stations
Former Midland Railway stations
Long Eaton
Railway stations in Great Britain opened in 1888
Railway stations served by East Midlands Railway
Railway stations served by CrossCountry